Dactylostelma is a species of plants in the Apocynaceae first described as a genus in 1895. It contains only one known species, Dactylostelma boliviense, endemic to Bolivia.

References

Flora of Bolivia
Asclepiadoideae
Monotypic Apocynaceae genera